Centenary Quay (also known as Woolston Riverside) is a new development which has commenced in the suburb of Woolston in Southampton, England. The development is being built on the site of 31 acres, which had been home to Vosper Thorneycroft shipbuilders because of its ideal placement on the eastern bank of the River Itchen.

Plans 
The initial plans were submitted in May 2008 for a mixed residential and commercial development of the quay.  There were also plans for a yacht building firm to move in and create 700 new jobs along with a  supermarket.  The plans included houses of different types, Crest Nicholson were offering 2,3 or 4 bedroom houses as well as building three large skyscrapers which containing hundreds of flats, a hotel and restaurants. The plans were agreed in August of that year.

Progress 

By late 2008, work began to clear the site of harmful materials and any other pollutants such as hydrocarbons, asbestos and harmful metals left over from the demolition of the dated Vosper Thornycroft warehouses and workshops. BAM Nuttall were contracted to complete this part of the work, and it soon became apparent that it would turn into a more complex operation than previously thought. Therefore, this delayed progress.

In July 2010, a foundation laying ceremony was held to commence the beginning of building work. Local councillors attended and the foundation stone was laid by the Secretary of State for Communities and Local Government, Eric Pickles.

In January 2011 Phase One of the development, development of around fifty three-bedroom terrace houses, neared completion.

References 

Buildings and structures in Southampton